Datia Assembly constituency is one of the 230 Vidhan Sabha (Legislative Assembly) constituencies of Madhya Pradesh state in central India. This constituency came into existence in 1951, as one of the 48 Vidhan Sabha constituencies of the erstwhile Vindhya Pradesh state.

Overview
Datia (constituency number 22) is one of the 3 Vidhan Sabha constituencies located in Datia district. This constituency covers the entire Datia Municipality and part of Datia tehsil of the district.

Datia is part of Bhind Lok Sabha constituency along with seven other Vidhan Sabha segments, namely, Bhander and Sewda in this district and Bhind, Ater, Lahar, Mehgaon and Gohad in Bhind district.

Members of Legislative Assembly
As a constituency of Vindhya Pradesh:
 1951: Shyam Sunder Das Shyam, Indian National Congress 
As a constituency of Madhya Pradesh:
 1957: Shyam Sunder Das Shyam, Indian National Congress
 1962: Pandit Surya Deo Sharma, Independent 
 1967: Shyam Sunder Das Shyam, Jana Congress
 1972: Gulab Chand Kanoolal, Bharatiya Jana Sangh
 1977: Shyam Sunder Das Shyam, Indian National Congress
 1980: Shyam Sunder Das Shyam, Indian National Congress (I)
 1985: Rajendra Kumar Bharti, Indian National Congress
 1990: Shambhu Tiwari, Bharatiya Janata Party
 1993: Ghanshyam Singh, Indian National Congress
 1998: Rajendra Kumar Bharti, Samajwadi Party
 2003: Ghanshyam Singh, Indian National Congress
 2008: Narottam Mishra, Bharatiya Janata Party
 2013: Narottam Mishra, Bharatiya Janata Party

See also
 Datia

References

Datia district
Assembly constituencies of Madhya Pradesh